{{Infobox album
| name       = Groovin'
| type       = Studio
| artist     = Paul Carrack
| cover      = Paul_Carrack_-_Groovin_2001.jpg
| alt        =
| released   = 2001
| recorded   =
| venue      =
| studio     =
| genre      = 
| length     = 40:44
| label      = Carrack-UK
| producer   = Paul Carrack
| prev_title = Satisfy My Soul
| prev_year  = 2000
| next_title = It Ain't Over
| next_year  = 2003
| misc       = {{Extra album cover
 | header  = Reissue cover
 | type    = Studio album
 | cover   = Paul_Carrack_-_Still_Groovin_2002.jpg
 | border  =
 | alt     =
 | caption = Artwork for 2002 release Still Groovin}}
}}Groovin' ''is the eighth solo studio album by the English singer-songwriter Paul Carrack, then a member of the supergroup Mike + The Mechanics. It was originally released in 2001 on Carrack's own Carrack-UK label.

This was Carrack's first all-covers album as a solo artist; he had previously helped create a hard rock covers album as the front man of the ad hoc 1993 quasi-supergroup Spin 1ne 2wo.  Groovin'  has a different feel from that project, as this album features a selection of Carrack's favourite Motown, R&B and pop songs of the 1960s and early 1970s.  Carrack produced the album himself, and played virtually all of the instruments.

There are several different issues of the album, including a 13-track version, a 14-track version, and an 18-track version known as Still Groovin' .  This last version of the album was issued in 2002, and also features a DVD of live performances and videos.

Track listing

Additional tracks

 Personnel 
Credits are adapted from the album's liner notes.
 Paul Carrack – vocals, keyboards, guitars, bass, drums, producer 
 Steve Beighton – saxophones
 Peter Van Hooke – executive producer
 Nigel Bates – mixing, mastering
 Bill Smith Studio – art direction, design 
 Paul Cox – photography 
 Reggie Pedro – illustrationDVD credits from Still Groovin' (Tracks 1-4)'''
 Paul Carrack – vocals, keyboards, guitars 
 Paul Copley – keyboards, vocals 
 John Robinson – guitars 
 Jeremy Meek – bass 
 Dean Duke – drums 
 Steve Beighton – saxophones 
 Lindsay Dracass – backing vocals 
 Peter Van Hooke – producer 
 Christopher Janschke – director, editing 
 Minkjam – post-production 
 Phil Gaines – director of photography 
 Anna Hawkins – titles, graphics 
 E-xentric Thinking – art direction, design 
 Alan Wood – tour manager

References

External links

2001 albums
Paul Carrack albums
Covers albums